Public School 39, also known as PS 39 The Henry Bristow School, is a historic school building located in Park Slope, Brooklyn, New York, New York. It is a part of the New York City Department of Education.

It was built in 1876-1877 and is a three-story symmetrical brick and stone building combining features of the Italianate and Second Empire styles.  The main facade features a central bay or tower with a rusticated first floor. The building has steep slate covered mansard roofs.

It was listed on the National Register of Historic Places in 1980.

Notable graduates include pitcher Adam Ottavino and politician Anthony Weiner.

References

External links
 PS 39

School buildings on the National Register of Historic Places in New York City
Public elementary schools in Brooklyn
New York City Designated Landmarks in Brooklyn
Second Empire architecture in New York City
School buildings completed in 1877
National Register of Historic Places in Brooklyn
1877 establishments in New York (state)